Aşık Sümmani (1861–1915) was an Aşık, a singer who performed with a lute, from Narman, Erzurum Province, Turkey. His name Sümmani means "the last one" or "the one who completes", as well as "a very hard rock stone".

Sümmani's works encompass a wide range of forms, from the hece form- kosma, semai, and destan- to works in aruz form- divani, musammat, gazel, and müstezat.

According to legend, Sümmani was once in love with Gülperi, a princess of the legendary land of Badesah, possibly in current Uzbekistan. He supposedly searched for her all his life.

Sümmani himself stated:
 "Sebavetten beri bir yol gözlerim." ("From early morning, from my childhood, I am looking at this special path.")
 "El zanneder uzaklarda kalan var." ("But the others think there is (a beauty) somewhere in the far distance waiting.")

External links
 
 Sümmani'nin Hayati ve Tavri, Istanbul Teknik Üniverstesi (UT Istanbul), Master thesis of Emsal Günaydin, 08.06.1998/23.06.1998, signed: Doc. Senal Önaldi, Prof. Dr. Selahadin Icli, Doc. Fikret Degerli

1861 births
1915 deaths